The Hits is a compilation album by Swedish Eurodance artist Jonny Jakobsen. It was published by Warner Bros. Records in 2007.

Although released under the pseudonym of Dr. Bombay, the album also features a number of tracks released by Jakobsen as Dr. Macdoo as well and, despite being a compilation, features two song that have not appeared on any of his previous studio albums.

Track listing
Calcutta (Taxi Taxi Taxi) – 3:19 	 	
Rice & Curry – 3:13 		
S.O.S (The Tiger Took My Family) – 3:26
Shaky Snake – 3:03
Spice It Up – 3:18
Girlie Girlie – 3:10
My Sitar – 3:04	
Indy Dancing – 3:18
FamilyMacDoo – 3:07	
Highland Reggae (From Glasgow To Bombay) – 3:27
Macahula Dance – 3:03	
Mayday! Mayday! – 3:13		
Loch Ness – 3:12
Under The Kilt – 3:13		
Mad Piper – 3:18		
Grandfather Mac Macdoo – 3:07		
Culcutta 2008 - Basshunter Remix – 3:20

Bonus material
In addition to a compilation of Jakobsen's most successful songs, the album features one never before released song, "Spice it Up", and a new remix of "Calcutta (Taxi Taxi Taxi)" by fellow Eurodance artist Basshunter.

Also-included in the compilation are music videos for the following songs:
Calcutta (Taxi, Taxi, Taxi)	
Rice & Curry	
S.O.S (The Tiger Took My Family) 		
Girlie Girlie	
Macahula Dance		
Under The Kilt

References

External links
The Album at last.fm
Dr. Bombay at Bubblegum Dancer

2006 albums
Jonny Jakobsen albums